Alexeyevka is a rural locality (a selo) and the administrative centre of Chukadybashevsky Selsoviet, Tuymazinsky District, Bashkortostan, Russia. The population was 257 as of 2010. There are 6 streets.

Geography 
Alexeyevka is located 56 km southeast of Tuymazy (the district's administrative centre) by road. Imyan-Kuper is the nearest rural locality.

References 

Rural localities in Tuymazinsky District